Laurette may refer to:
Laurette (given name)
Laurette (play), 1960 American play based on the life of Laurette Taylor and starring Judy Holliday
Laurette, Illinois
Buckskin Joe, Park County, Colorado, a ghost town originally called Laurette
Matthieu Laurette

See also
Loretta (disambiguation)
Sailly-Laurette, a commune in France